Albert Michael  Zwar (17 July 1863 – 23 February 1935) was an Australian liberal/conservative politician, Member of Upper House and tannery owner. Zwar was born in Broadford, Victoria and died in Beechworth, Victoria.

References

1863 births
1935 deaths
Members of the Victorian Legislative Council
Australian Anglicans
Australian people of German descent
National Party of Australia members of the Parliament of Victoria
People of Sorbian descent
20th-century Australian politicians
19th-century Australian businesspeople
20th-century Australian businesspeople
People from Beechworth